Rubellite is the red or pink variety of tourmaline and is a member of elbaite. Rubellite is also the rarest gem in its gem family. It is occasionally mistaken for ruby. These gems typically contain inclusions.

Notable places where rubellite can be mined includes Afghanistan, Brazil, Madagascar, Myanmar, Nigeria, Russia, and the United States.

Name 
Rubellite is named after the Latin word for red. The word rubellite was first used in the year 1794.

The gem is also called Aphrite, Apyrite, Rubelite, or Rubylite.

Value 
Rubellite is the most expensive and prized gem in the tourmaline group. The most valuable rubellites are those that are colored red and have no brown.

Ones that are of ruby color are the most valuable.

References 

Gemstones
Tourmalines